7500 may refer to:
 The year 7500, in the 8th millennium
 ATI Radeon 7500, a computer graphics card series
 NVIDIA GeForce 7500, a computer graphics card series
 Nokia 7500, a mobile phone released in 2007
 Emergency Aviation Transponder code, indicating a possible hijacking
 Flight 7500, a 2014 horror film
 7500 (film), a 2019 action thriller film